Douglas "Doogie" White (born 7 March 1960) is a Scottish rock vocalist who currently sings for La Paz and Alcatrazz. He has also notably sung for Ritchie Blackmore's Rainbow, Yngwie Malmsteen's Rising Force, Praying Mantis and Tank.

Early life and career 
White was born in Motherwell. He formed La Paz with guitarist Chic McSherry in 1984, playing around Scotland for four years and releasing two albums on cassette, before in 1988 joining melodic rock combo Midnight Blue, cutting one album (released on Zero Records exclusively in Japan).

A trip to Japan in 1991 singing with Praying Mantis in a NWOBHM revival tour followed.

Career

Rainbow 
After a demo tape forwarded to Ritchie Blackmore's management sat in a box for a few years, Candice Night discovered it and presented it to Blackmore when he was looking for singers to audition for Rainbow. Consequently, White was asked to audition for Rainbow, subsequently joining the band in 1994. He had also auditioned for metal bands Pink Cream 69 and Iron Maiden, losing out to Wolfsbane's Blaze Bayley.

To indicate how quickly his fortunes had changed in the year since meeting Blackmore, when Rainbow played the Labbatt's Apollo in Hammersmith, London in November 1995, he joked with the audience that the last time he was at the venue only a few years before, he was selling hotdogs in the lobby.

Just before the Rainbow job, White had been busy laying down tracks with Cozy Powell and Neil Murray for a solo Powell project.

Other professional activities 
After the end of Rainbow in 1997, he then worked with former Midnight Blue guitarist Alex Dickson with the intention of securing a solo deal. Sessions on several tribute releases were next, the Whitesnake tribute Snakebites (2000), and several tracks included on 666 Number of the Beast (2004) a two-volume tribute to Iron Maiden out on Deadline. White also guested on Nikolo Kotzev's conceptual Nostradamus 2001 release.

A contribution to Royal Hunt bassist Steen Morgensen's solo project Arrival (under the moniker Cornerstone) was released in late 2000. A further series of albums were produced this time with White's creative input. White also joined Yngwie Malmsteen's Rising Force, touring through South America in late 2001, while Attack (2002) was White's first studio effort with the Swede.

Once Upon Our Yesterdays (2003) was the next Cornerstone album, and a set of dates for the band across Europe marked their live debut. In 2003, White was once again hired by Praying Mantis to provide vocals for half of the songs of their album The Journey Goes On.

In 2005, White fronted another Malmsteen opus, titled Unleash the Fury. In this year, he also recorded an album with guitarist Bill Liesegang under the Liesegang/White moniker. He also put together a part-time band with Mostly Autumn personnel monikered White Noise. A DVD from their support stint in the UK with Uriah Heep featured a live airing of "Tarot Woman" as well as other Rainbow tracks.

in July 2007 he auditioned to lead sing for the israeli project Amaseffer but lost the part to Mats Levén

In 2007, the fourth Cornerstone album, Two Tales of One Tomorrow was released. Later the same year, White replaced Tony Martin as the frontman of the German band Empire. Empire released their fourth album Chasing Shadows in November, with White handling all vocal duties. On 26 February 2008, White announced on his website that he would no longer be a member of Yngwie Malmsteen's Rising Force.

On 20 December 2008, White was announced to be the new singer for NWOBHM band Tank. Tank's first album with White as lead singer is titled War Machine and was released in October 2010. In 2009, White was performing with La Paz again, as well as Tank. He has also recorded the vocals for an English version of the latest album by Argentinian rockers Rata Blanca.

He performed with Jon Lord twice, stepping in for Lord's regular singer Steve Balsamo. On 1 September 2009, White sang vocal parts in Lord's Concerto for Group and Orchestra at the opening night of the Fall Arts Fest in Plovdiv, Bulgaria. On 23 June 2010 he performed with Lord again, this time in Luxembourg during the Classic Rock Night with Big Band Opus 78.

In 2010, White participated in a tribute album titled Mister Bolin's Late Night Revival, a compilation of 17 previously unreleased tracks written by Tommy Bolin prior to his death in 1976. The CD included other artists such as HiFi Superstar, Eric Martin, Troy Luccketta, Jeff Pilson, Randy Jackson, Rachel Barton, Rex Carroll, Derek St. Holmes, Kimberley Dahme, and The 77s. A percentage of the proceeds from this project will benefit the Jackson Recovery Centers.

In 2011, White released an album with original material with German band Demon's Eye, titled The Stranger Within. White released his first solo album, titled As Yet Untitled in October 2011. He also completed an album of new material and reworked old songs with his first band La Paz. This album was called Granite and was released in February 2012. Tank released a second album with White on vocals, War Nation, in 2012.

A La Paz album with all new songs titled The Dark and the Light was released in May 2013. White has recently recorded an album with Michael Schenker titled Bridge the Gap, to be released in November 2013. He recorded an album with Vinny Appice, Marco Mendoza and Iggy Gwadera in 2014. In 2015, White released another album with Demon's Eye, titled Under The Neon and collaborated in the second Stardust Reverie Project album titled Proclamation of Shadows singing the tunes "410 Chelsea Street" and "Bring me the Hat of the Wizard from the West" (Doogie appears in the video made for this song).

White recorded two albums with Michael Schenker under the Temple of Rock moniker. Schenker reinvented his band as Michael Schenker Fest in 2017, which included various vocalists who had previously sung for it, including White. In 2020, White joined Alcatrazz, replacing original vocalist Graham Bonnet, with whom he had been part of Michael Schenker Fest. His most recent project is an album with Persuader guitarist Emil Norberg under the name Long Shadows Dawn.

Band timeline 
 La Paz (1984–1988, 2009–present)
 Midnight Blue (1994)
 Ritchie Blackmore's Rainbow  (1994–1997)
 Chain (1997)
 Cornerstone (2000–2007)
 Yngwie Malmsteen's Rising Force (2002–2007)
 Liesegang / White (2005)
 The Company of Snakes (2005)
 Empire (2007)
 Solo (2008–present)
 Tank (2008–2014)
 Rata Blanca (2009–2010)
 Demon's Eye (2011–2015)
 Michael Schenker's Temple of Rock (2011–2016)
 WAMI (2014)
 Michael Schenker Fest (2018–present)
 Alcatrazz (2020–present)

Discography

Guest sessions 
Gary Hughes: Once and Future King Part II (2003)
Takayoshi Ohmura: Nowhere to Go (2004)
Takayoshi Ohmura: Emotions in Motion (2007)
Anphoria's Empire: Single "Believe in the Mothercorn" (2009) (Story about this song)
Sebastien: Tears of White Roses (2010)
Roadway: ROADWAY (2011)

Cornerstone 

Cornerstone is a hard rock band formed by former Rainbow vocalist Doogie White and former Royal Hunt bassist Steen Mogensen. Other musicians have been added to that core including guitarists Jacob Kjaer, Kasper Damgaard and drummer Allan Sorensen. The band has put out four studio albums and one live double compact disc release.

Discography 
  Arrival  (2000)
  Human Stain  (2002)
 Once Upon Our Yesterdays (2003)
 In Concert (2005)
 Two Tales of One Tomorrow (2007)

Videography 
 White Noise: In the Hall of the Mountain King (2004)
 Deep Purple Rock Review 1969–1972 (2004)
 Inside Black Sabbath (2004)
 Inside Rainbow (2004)
 M 3: Rough an' Ready (2006)
 Guitar Gods – Ritchie Blackmore (2007)
 Rainbow: Black Masquerade – Rockpalast '95 (2013)

References

External links 

 
 LaPaz website
 Demon's Eye website
 Doogie White discography and album reviews, credits & releases at AllMusic
 Doogie White discography, album releases & credits at Discogs.com
 Doogie White albums to be listened as stream at Spotify.com

Scottish heavy metal musicians
20th-century Scottish male singers
Scottish rock singers
Scottish tenors
Living people
People from Motherwell
Rainbow (rock band) members
1960 births
Tank (band) members
Rata Blanca members
Michael Schenker Group members
Yngwie J. Malmsteen's Rising Force members
The Company of Snakes members
Empire (German band) members